Ships named Anshan include:

See also
 Anshan (disambiguation)

Ship names